Vishwapriya Nagar or Vishwapriya Nagara is a semi-autonomous ward or residential district in Bangalore, India, sometimes referred to as Vishwapriya Layout. It is 3 km from Bommanahalli. The development is divided into 3 compound blocks. Each block consists of 22 crosses, separated by 2 main roads.

Description
This layout was developed by Shri. Katta Subramanyam Naidu, Ex minister of Karnataka.

Transportation 
BMTC buses plying between Begur and KR Market/Shivaji Nagar/Kempegowda Bus Stand have to pass by this place. BMTC buses to Majestic and Shivaji Nagar ply from Vishwapriya Nagara. Various bus routes exist such as: 362C, 343,etc.,. Auto Rickshaw services are prominent..Roads in this area to be improved.

Garbage Issue 
Many residents think this area is only till 19th Cross & after Rajakaluve from 20th cross onward people daily dump Garbage & polluting the surroundings & which is effecting 50+ families residing there. Residents (Especially Kids & old people) facing health issues & bad smell from this Garbage dump.

Schools
There is a private school available for primary education. There is also a Government school opposite to Vishwapriya Nagar which has a huge playground.

Health and Medical Support
Jayashree Multi Specialty hospital is located in Vishwapriya Nagar. It provides quality care with advanced technology at affordable prices and 24/7 care, which is well equipped with clinical lab, x-ray, scanning, operation theater and hygienic wards. It also conducts joint-replacement, endoscopic surgery, and multidisciplinary treatment, along with well equipped ICU and has patient friendly ambiance. It is now under expansion coming up with better facilities like deluxe wards Hi-tech operation theatres, intensive care unit and dialysis. There are various other clinics nearby such as the Eshwari Dental Clinic and Implant Center which offers treatments such as root canal treatment, surgical extraction, tooth jewellery, crown and bridge, orthodontic treatment, etc., performed by Dr. Kaushal Rao.

There are many pharmaceuticals such as Jayashree pharma, the Apollo Pharmacy.

Food

There are various eateries and shops available in the locality. The chat stall near the Jayashree Multi speciality Hospital has various chats such as Pani puri, Bhel puri, masala puri, samosa chat, dahi puri, Vada pav, etc. They are also cheap starting from rupees 15. There are many hotels and fast food joints near the layout. The food here is not as costly as it is in some parts of Bangalore.

Climate

The temperature here is relatively lower than the temperatures in most parts of Bangalore. On an average it varies from 21 °C to 34 °C throughout the year. Humidity is also relatively lower compared to other parts of Bangalore. The presence of many trees planted by the BBMP Forest Department contributes to the cooler environment. Rainfall is less compared to other parts of the city's annual rainfall.

Other Facilities

There exists a Patanjalli store, a number of ATMs with security guards, laundry stores, fruits and vegetable stores, cyber cafe (internet store), etc. There are some hardware shops and some utilities stores. There also exists a photo studio within the layout and a party hall named Manjunatha party hall at 6th cross. The Canara Bank Begur Branch is at walkable distance and Bharath co-operative bank is located at 9th cross of the Vishwapriya Nagara. Like many other localities, it has its own residents' welfare association.
A Lord Ganesha Temple in the 1st cross is visited by many. The Begur Lake is nearby. Cauvery (Kaveri) water work is in progress in this area but there exists many water providers.

Social Campaigner

5th Cross 1st Block
Mr V.L. Ashok kumar M.Tech living in Vishwapriya layout who is creating impact to the people on Traditional methods.

See also

 Bommanahalli
 Bangalore
 Begur

References

External links
  BBMP Elections 2010. Ward 192